Vanessa Erin Moody (born November 20, 1996) is an American fashion model.

Career

Moody's father encouraged her to pursue modeling and sent her to an open call at The Campbell Agency in Dallas. She debuted as an exclusive for Alexander Wang (opening his F/W 2014 show) and Balenciaga; the next season she walked in almost 50 shows, including closing for Givenchy. She has appeared in campaigns for Alexander Wang, Valentino, Versace Jeans, Coach New York, and Michael Kors.

In 2014, Moody was chosen as a "Top Newcomer" by models.com. She previously ranked on their "Money Girl" list.

Moody walked in the 2017 Victoria’s Secret Fashion Show.

References 

1996 births
Living people
American female models
Female models from Texas
People from Lewisville, Texas
Women Management models
21st-century American women